Mark Epstein (born 1953 or 1954) sometimes known as Mark "Puggy" Epstein is an American property developer and the brother of financier Jeffrey Epstein.

A former artist, Epstein has founded and led real estate companies, a T-shirt printing business, a modelling agency and a charter company. His wealth and the source of it has been the subject of investigation by both Dow Jones Institutional News and The Wall Street Journal.

Early life and education 
Their parents were Pauline (née Stolofsky, 1918–2004) and Seymour G. Epstein (1916–1991) who were Jewish and had married in 1952. The brothers grew up in the working-class neighborhood of Sea Gate, a private gated community in Coney Island, Brooklyn, New York City.

He is a 1976 graduate of the New York City Cooper Union art school. He also studied at Stony Brook University. In 2002, he was Cooper Union's Alumnus of the Year.

Career 
A former artist, Epstein has been a real estate investor since the 1990s. He was the president of J. Epstein & Co, his brother's investment company and an executive of Ossa Properties. He is the owner of a T-shirt printing company Izmo that he founded in 1986. He also was the head of Atelier Enterprises, a leasing and chartering company. From 1987 to 2015 he was the owner-operator of Epstein Acquisitions, and in 2005 he incorporated Saint Model and Talent. 

The source of Mark Epstein's wealth has been described by both Dow Jones Institutional News and The Wall Street Journal (WSJ) as mysterious, after he refused to answer WSJ's journalists' questions about the source of his wealth. The newspaper noted his ownership of the $1m luxury yacht Izmo, and a 16-storey condominium that he purchased from Les Wexner in the 1990s. The building had a mortgage of $7.24 million at the time. He is a six-figure donor to the art school that he studied at, Cooper Union, and was the chair of the school's governing board. He donated his luxury yacht Izmo to the Marine Science and Nautical Training Academy in Charleston. He also served on the board of directors of the Humpty Dumpty Institute, an international charity that he loaned over $100,000 to in 2014. He also loaned $75,000 to Exit Art, a not-for-profit cultural center that he also was a board director for.

Politics and personal life 
Epstein has been involved with politicians Adam Schiff, Debbie Wasserman Schultz, and Maxine Waters.

After his brother Jeffrey died in prison in 2019, he has shared his belief that Jeffrey was killed. Mark was identified by court papers as Jeffrey's only potential heir.

He has two children with Joyce Anderson, who he lived with in SoHo for seven years before their relationship ended. He has a home in Pennsylvania and property in West Palm Beach, Florida.

References 

1950s births
Jeffrey Epstein
20th-century American artists
20th-century American businesspeople
21st-century American businesspeople
Real estate and property developers
Cooper Union alumni
People from Sea Gate, Brooklyn
Stony Brook University alumni
Jewish American philanthropists